Oak Ridge North (commonly referred to as Oak Ridge) is a city in Montgomery County, Texas, United States. It is located along Interstate 45 10 miles (16 km) south of Conroe and 35 miles north of Houston. The population was 3,057 at the 2020 census.

Geography
Oak Ridge North is located at  (30.158702, –95.444084).

Demographics

As of the 2020 United States census, there were 3,057 people, 1,216 households, and 953 families residing in the city.

As of the 2010 census, there were 3,049 people, 1131 households, and 909 families residing in the city. The population density was 2,771.8 people per square mile (1016.3/km). There were 1,131 housing units at an average density of 1028.2/sq mi (377/km). The racial makeup of the city was 93.8% White, 1.3% African American, 0.4% Native American, 1.2% Asian, 1.5% from other races, and 1.7% from two or more races. Hispanic or Latino of any race were 10.2% of the population.

There were 1131 households, out of which 27.1% had children under the age of 18 living with them. 70.7% were married couples living together, 6.8% had a female householder with no husband present, and 19.6% were non-families. 15.9% of all households were made up of individuals. The average household size was 2.69 and the average family size was 3.01.

In the city, the population was spread out, with 20.8% under the age of 18, 6.9% from 18 to 24, 19.8% from 25 to 44, 34.8% from 45 to 64, and 17.6% who were 65 years of age or older. The median age was 46.7 years. For every 100 females, there were 99.0 males. For every 100 females age 18 and over, there were 96.4 males.

In the 2015 American Community Survey, The median income for a household in the city was $88,500, and the median income for a family was $99,250. Males had a median income of $89,167 versus $41,917 for females. The per capita income for the city was $40,267. About 5.1% of families and 6.1% of the population were below the poverty line, including 15.3% of those under age 18 and 3.6% of those age 65 or over.

History
In 1964, the Arkansas-based Spring Pines Corporation purchased a large tract of land containing what is now Oak Ridge North with the intention of creating a subdivision along Interstate 45. United Diversified, Inc. took over the development in 1969. Associated Properties Company, which became the chief developer in 1971, added more land to the subdivision.

In the 1970s, as Houston began annexing territories closer to the border of Montgomery County, many residents expressed concern about the possibility of their community being annexed. As a result, the community voted in favor of incorporation in 1979.

Government
Oak Ridge North is governed locally by a mayor and five-member city council. All members are at-large. As of June 2022, the mayor is Paul Bond. The city council members are Rick Moffatt, Clint McClaren, Alex Jones, Dawn Candy, and Frances Planchard. Alex Jones also serves as Mayor pro tem. Oak Ridge North operates a council-manager form of government, which delegates the administrative tasks of the government to a city manager appointed by the city council. As of June 2022, the city manager is Heather Neeley.

In the Texas Senate, Oak Ridge North is in District 4, represented by Republican Brandon Creighton. In the Texas House of Representatives, Oak Ridge North is in District 15, represented by Republican Mark Keough.

In the United States Senate, Republicans John Cornyn and Ted Cruz represent the entire state of Texas. In the United States House of Representatives, Oak Ridge North is in District 8, represented by Kevin Brady.

Education

Oak Ridge North is served by the Conroe Independent School District.

Students from this city feed into Oak Ridge Elementary School, Vogel Intermediate School, Irons Junior High School, and Oak Ridge High School.

The city is also a part of the Lone Star College System.

See also

 List of municipalities in Texas

Notes

References

External links

 

Cities in Texas
Cities in Montgomery County, Texas
Greater Houston